Poppy is a 1917 American silent adventure drama film directed by Edward José and starring Norma Talmadge, Eugene O'Brien, and Frederick Perry.

Plot
As described in a film magazine review, Poppy Destin, ill-treated from birth, runs away and falls into the hands of a wealthy man who adores her. Fearless lest he lose her, he marries her without her knowledge. Complications arise which make her life even more bitter, but finally the man releases her from the marriage, making it possible for Poppy to marry the man she loves.

Cast

Preservation
The film is presumed to be lost, with the Library of Congress having a two-reel condensation of the second half of the film.

References

External links

1917 films
American silent feature films
American black-and-white films
Films directed by Edward José
American adventure drama films
1910s adventure drama films
Lost American films
Selznick Pictures films
1917 drama films
1910s American films
Silent American drama films
Silent adventure drama films